= Emanuel Goldman =

American microbiologist

Emanuel Goldman is professor of microbiology at Rutgers University. In July 2020 he queried the real-life applicability of research that showed COVID-19 could survive on surfaces.

However, he states, "In my opinion, the chance of transmission through inanimate surfaces is very small, and only in instances where an infected person coughs or sneezes on the surface, and someone else touches that surface soon after the cough or sneeze (within 1–2 h)."

Goldman graduated from the Bronx High School of Science in 1962, Brandeis University (1966, B.A. cum laude, chemistry) and he completed his Ph.D. in biochemistry at M.I.T. in 1972. He did postdoctoral work at Harvard Medical School and the University of California, Irvine.
